Anoure Obiora (born 4 April 1986) is a Nigerian footballer. He previously played as a forward for Persisam Putra Samarinda in Indonesia Super League.

Honours

Sriwijaya
Premier Division: 2007–08
Copa Indonesia: 2007, 2009, 2010

Individual
Copa Indonesia Best Player: 2009

References

External links

1986 births
Living people
Nigerian footballers
Expatriate footballers in Indonesia
Association football forwards
Indonesian Premier Division players
Liga 1 (Indonesia) players
I-League players
PSDS Deli Serdang players
Sriwijaya F.C. players
PSM Makassar players
Persebaya Surabaya players
Perseman Manokwari players
Sporting Clube de Goa players
Persisam Putra Samarinda players
Indonesian Super League-winning players
Jasper United F.C. players